Lauren Michelle O'Reilly is a former New Zealand rugby union player.

Biography 
O'Reilly played as a hooker for Canterbury, Taranaki, and New Zealand. She made her debut for the Black Ferns against the Auckland XV in 1992 at Auckland. She later earned her only official cap against Australia at Sydney in 1994. In all, she played four games for the Black Ferns between 1992 and 1994, but did not score any points.

In 2019, O'Reilly and several former Black Ferns were capped in a special ceremony in Auckland. She is the 44th capped Black Fern.

O'Reilly's father, Laurie, was the first coach of the New Zealand women's national rugby union team.

O'Reilly was educated at Riccarton High School, and went on to study at the University of Canterbury, graduating with a Bachelor of Education degree in 1988, and a Master of Education degree in 1995. She has been a careers advisor and physical education teacher at Francis Douglas Memorial College in New Plymouth for over 20 years.

References 

Year of birth missing (living people)
Living people
Rugby union players from Christchurch
People educated at Riccarton High School
University of Canterbury alumni
New Zealand female rugby union players
New Zealand women's international rugby union players
Rugby union hookers
New Zealand schoolteachers